Bai Lifang (born ) is a female Chinese former football goalkeeper. She was part of the China women's national football team  at the 2000 Summer Olympics, but did not play.

References

1978 births
Living people
Chinese women's footballers
Place of birth missing (living people)
Women's association football goalkeepers
Footballers at the 2000 Summer Olympics
Olympic footballers of China